The Computer Edition of Scrabble is a computer game developed by Leisure Genius for the Macintosh in 1988, and was an official computerized version of the board game Scrabble.

Gameplay
The Computer Edition of Scrabble reproduced the game board, tiles, and game pieces onscreen. A clock is included to promote rapid thinking to spell and place words within a user-defined time limit. The game also has lightning- and tournament-timing alternatives. The player's letter rack is visible at the bottom of the screen. The player types a word composed of letters from the rack, and if the word is acceptable by the game, the player moves the cursor to the game board to position the word onscreen and score the move. The player may also pass a turn, request a hint of one playable word, and see the tile values at any time through the use of a pull-down menu.

Reception
In 1988, Dragon gave the Macintosh version of the game 3 out of 5 stars. Macworld reviewed the Macintosh version of Computer Scrabble, praising its faithfulness to the original board game, and challenging AI opponent. They also praise Scrabble's graphics, stating that the "game board is well designed, with premium-word and -letter squares that are easy to distinguish." Macworld criticizes its incompatibility with older keyboards, stating that "pressing any key on the bottom row produces the letter to its left", and a glitch where the game refuses any valid words entered, requiring the game to be rebooted.

M. Evan Brooks reviewed the computer editions of Risk, Monopoly, Scrabble, and Clue for Computer Gaming World, and stated that "In this reviewer's opinion, Scrabble is the weakest product (given cumbersome play and graphics), while Risk and Clue: Master Detective are the strongest."

References

External links

Review in Compute!'s Gazette
Review in Info
Review in Your Sinclair

1988 video games
Apple II games
Classic Mac OS games
DOS games
Leisure Genius games
Scrabble software
Single-player video games
Video games based on board games
Video games developed in the United Kingdom